Charalampos "Babis" Perperidis (Greek: Χαράλαμπος "Μπάμπης" Περπερίδης, born 29 April 1986) is a Greek footballer who plays for Gamma Ethniki club Pandramaikos.

Club career
Began his career as professional footballer in Iraklis Thessaloniki F.C. in 2004. Until 2010 he competed in Super League with Iraklis Thessaloniki F.C. In August 2010, Perperidis signed a contract with Panthrakikos F.C. In July 2011, he signed a contract with Panserraikos F.C.

International career
Perperidis has represented Greece at U-17 and U-19 level.

Career statistics

Date of last update: 22 July 2011

References

External links
Babis Perperidis in the official page of Iraklis Salonica
Profile at epae.org

Greek footballers
Greece youth international footballers
1986 births
Living people
Super League Greece players
Iraklis Thessaloniki F.C. players
Panthrakikos F.C. players
Footballers from Drama, Greece
Association football defenders
Association football fullbacks
Greece under-21 international footballers